The 2021 NTT IndyCar Series was the 26th season of the IndyCar Series and the 110th official championship season of American open wheel racing. The premier event was the 2021 Indianapolis 500, won by Hélio Castroneves (Meyer Shank Racing). It was the second year under Penske management after they took over in late 2019. Scott Dixon (Chip Ganassi Racing) entered his 21st season competing for a National Championship as the defending champion, but ultimately finished the campaign in fourth place.

Second-year driver Álex Palou became the first Spanish driver to win the series championship, winning a joint-most three races during the campaign for Chip Ganassi Racing. He finished 38 points clear of Team Penske's Josef Newgarden, who won two races, and finished second in points for the second year in succession. Third place in the championship went to Pato O'Ward for Arrow McLaren SP, who like Newgarden, won two races during the season. A total of nine drivers won races during the season, with Colton Herta (Andretti Autosport) also winning three races. The Manufacturers' Cup was won by Honda for the fourth consecutive season, while Scott McLaughlin (Team Penske) won Rookie of the Year honors.

Background

2021 was to be the final season that the Dallara DW12 UAK18 and Dallara DW12 chassis package (which debuted in 2012 and 2018 respectively) was to be used in competition. It was also scheduled to be the final season for the 2.2-litre V6 twin-turbocharged engine package that debuted in 2012; in October 2020, this was delayed for an additional season, as a consequence of the COVID-19 pandemic.

Confirmed entries
The following teams, entries, and drivers have been announced to compete in the 2021 NTT IndyCar Series season. All teams will use a spec Dallara DW12 chassis with UAK18 aero kit and Firestone tires.

Driver changes
Seven-time NASCAR Cup Series champion Jimmie Johnson partnered with Chip Ganassi Racing to finalize sponsorship on a program to run all of IndyCar's road/street courses in 2021–2022. On October 24, 2020, the car number and primary sponsor for Johnson's car were announced, respectively the No. 48 (Johnson's long-time NASCAR number, with Hendrick Motorsports, and a number Ganassi had previously fielded in the Xfinity Series) and Carvana.
A. J. Foyt Enterprises signed Sébastien Bourdais to drive the No. 14 entry full-time in the 2021 season. Bourdais also drove the No. 14 for the final three races of 2020.
Arrow McLaren SP announced that Oliver Askew, who had driven the No. 7 car in 2020, would not return to the team for the 2021 season. Felix Rosenqvist moved from Chip Ganassi Racing to replace Askew. Askew came back to the No. 7 car for the second race in Detroit, as Rosenqvist was hospitalized after an accident in the weekend's first race. Rosenqvist was then replaced for the next race at Road America by former Formula One and Haas reserve driver Kevin Magnussen after not being medically cleared to drive.
 Team Penske announced that three-time Supercars champion Scott McLaughlin would race full-time for the team in IndyCar in 2021.
Chip Ganassi Racing signed Álex Palou to drive the No. 10 full-time in the 2021 season.
 After competing in three races in 2020 with both Team Penske and Arrow McLaren SP, Hélio Castroneves contested a six-race schedule in 2021 with Meyer Shank Racing.
 Chip Ganassi Racing re-signed Tony Kanaan to a two-year contract to contest the oval events, in complement to Jimmie Johnson's road & street course schedule in the No. 48 entry. Kanaan previously drove for the team between 2014 and 2017.
Colton Herta switched from the No. 88 Harding Steinbrenner-backed car to the No. 26, sponsored by Gainbridge.
Arrow McLaren SP announced that two-time Indianapolis 500 winner Juan Pablo Montoya drove their third entry in the Indianapolis 500. This was Montoya's first Indianapolis 500 appearance since 2017. Montoya also drove the IndyGP.
Paretta Autosport, a new team run by former Dodge/SRT Motorsports director Beth Paretta, announced that Simona de Silvestro drove a Team Penske-engineered Chevrolet in the Indianapolis 500. This was de Silvestro's first IndyCar and Indianapolis 500 appearance since 2015.
James Hinchcliffe re-joined Andretti Autosport full-time in the No. 29 after competing in 6 races for the team in the 2020 season.
Dale Coyne Racing with Vasser-Sullivan signed Ed Jones for the 2021 season. This was Jones' second stint with Dale Coyne Racing, having driven for them in the 2017 season.
Dale Coyne Racing with Rick Ware Racing announced that Romain Grosjean would be racing for the team, driving the No. 51 entry on road and street circuits, after 10 seasons in Formula One. Pietro Fittipaldi drove the No. 51 on the ovals. Fittipaldi returned to the IndyCar Series for the first time since 2018. The team later announced that Cody Ware would make his IndyCar debut at Road America driving the No. 52 for Dale Coyne Racing with Rick Ware Racing. Ryan Norman piloted the No. 52 at Mid-Ohio.
Santino Ferrucci drove for Rahal Letterman Lanigan Racing in the Indianapolis 500. Ferrucci previously drove for Dale Coyne Racing from 2018 to 2020. Ferrucci was later signed for two additional races for the Detroit doubleheader. Ferrucci made further appearances at Mid-Ohio and Nashville.
J. R. Hildebrand signed to drive for A. J. Foyt Enterprises for the Indianapolis 500 running a tribute livery for the 60th anniversary of A. J. Foyt's first win in the race.
Stefan Wilson signed to drive for Andretti Autosport for the Indianapolis 500. It was Wilson's first IndyCar start since the 2018 Indianapolis 500.
Oliver Askew joined Ed Carpenter Racing at Road America as a substitute after Rinus VeeKay suffered injuries in a cycling accident. Askew drove the No. 45 Rahal Letterman Lanigan Racing entry for the final three races of the 2021 season.
Formula 2 and Alpine Academy driver Christian Lundgaard made his IndyCar Series debut at the Big Machine Spiked Coolers Grand Prix at Indianapolis Motor Speedway, driving the No. 45 Rahal Letterman Lanigan Racing entry.
Alfa Romeo reserve driver and Scuderia Ferrari test driver Callum Ilott contested the final three races of the season, driving the No. 77 entry for Juncos Hollinger Racing.

Team changes
On October 28, 2020, it was announced that DragonSpeed, who competed on a part-time basis in the previous 2 seasons, left the IndyCar Series.
Team Penske ended their partnership with Supercars team Dick Johnson Racing (with whom McLaughlin won his three titles) to make room for another IndyCar entry and thus returned to competing with four cars for the first time since 2017.
Meyer Shank Racing added a second, part time entry for Hélio Castroneves after purchasing the car put up for sale by DragonSpeed.
Chip Ganassi Racing also returned to a regular four-car team for the first time since 2017.
Dale Coyne Racing announced a partnership with Rick Ware Racing (who field full- and part-time entries in numerous other series including the NASCAR Cup and Asian Le Mans Series) for the full season, changing the number of the team's second entry from No. 19 to No. 51.
On February 18, 2021, Andretti Autosport mentioned that James Hinchcliffe's No. 29 entry would compete under the banner of "Andretti Steinbrenner Autosport", with one of the partners from the former Andretti Harding Steinbrenner Autosport entry, George Steinbrenner IV, returning as a partner.
New entrant Top Gun Racing attempted to qualify for the Indianapolis 500 with R. C. Enerson after shelving their plans to run the 2020 Indianapolis 500. The team later ran at the Big Machine Spiked Cooler Grand Prix.
On August 3, 2021, the newly renamed Juncos Hollinger Racing announced that it would return to top-level IndyCar competition for the first time since the 2019 Indianapolis 500, contesting the final three races of 2021 in preparation for a full-time campaign beginning in 2022. The announcement also mentioned that former Williams F1 shareholder Brad Hollinger had become a co-owner of the team.

Schedule
On October 1, 2020, a seventeen-race calendar was announced. Iowa Speedway did not return from the 2020 IndyCar Series calendar, while all tracks that were unable to host races in 2020 due to the COVID-19 pandemic returned to the calendar with the exception of Circuit of the Americas and Richmond Raceway. A second road course race at Indianapolis was held once again, as part of a doubleheader on Brickyard weekend in August.

On December 17, 2020, it was announced that in order to provide "the best opportunity to provide our guests with a fun and exciting experience in a safe and unrestricted environment", the Acura Grand Prix of Long Beach would be rescheduled from April 18 to September 26, becoming the season finale. Combined with the Portland and Laguna Seca events, this formed a three-race west coast swing to conclude the season, while for the second consecutive year the season would conclude with a street course race.

On January 6, 2021, the Firestone Grand Prix of St. Petersburg was rescheduled to April 25 because of the COVID-19 pandemic, with the season opener being moved to Barber Motorsports Park.

On January 22, 2021, the Honda Indy Grand Prix of Alabama was rescheduled to April 18 because of the COVID-19 pandemic and was now on NBC network television.

On May 14, 2021, the Honda Indy Toronto was cancelled for a second successive season, due to the restrictions imposed in Ontario because of the COVID-19 pandemic.

Results

Points standings

 Ties are broken by number of wins, followed by number of 2nds, 3rds, etc.; then by finishing position in the previous race; then by random draw.

Driver standings
 At all races except the Indy 500, the pole position qualifier earned 1 point (unless qualifying is not held). The top nine Indy 500 qualifiers received points, descending from 9 points for the pole position. At double header races, the fastest qualifier of each qualifying group earned 1 point.
 Drivers who lead at least one race lap were awarded 1 point. The driver who leads the most laps during a race scored an additional 2 points.
 Entrant-initiated engine change-outs before the engine reached their required distance run resulted in the loss of 10 points.

Entrant standings
 Based on the entrant, used for oval qualifications order, and starting grids when qualifying is cancelled.
 Only full-time entrants, and at-large part-time entrants shown.

Manufacturer standings
 All manufacturer points (including qualifying points, race finish points, and race win bonus points) could only be earned by full-season entrants, and provided they were using an engine from their initial allocation, or had mileaged out all previously used engines. Ineligible cars were removed from the finishing order used for race finish points, and could not score pole or win bonus points.
 The top two finishing entrants from each manufacturer in each race scored points for their respective manufacturer. The manufacturer that won each race was awarded five additional points.
 At all races except the Indy 500, the manufacturer who qualified on pole earned one point. At the Indy 500, the fastest Saturday qualifier earned one point, while the pole position winner on Sunday earned two points.

See also
2021 Indy Lights
2021 Indy Pro 2000 Championship
2021 U.S. F2000 National Championship

Footnotes

References

Sources

External links
 

 
IndyCar Series
IndyCar Series seasons